Sharks (French:Requins) is a 1917 French silent crime film directed by André Hugon and starring Charles Krauss, Marcel Bérard and André Nox.

Cast
 Charles Krauss 
 Marcel Bérard 
 André Nox 
 Jean Signoret 
 Maryse Dauvray 
 Marie-Louise Derval

References

Bibliography
 Rège, Philippe. Encyclopedia of French Film Directors, Volume 1. Scarecrow Press, 2009.

External links

1917 films
Films directed by André Hugon
French silent films
1917 crime films
French black-and-white films
French crime films
1910s French films
1910s French-language films